Three Bridges may refer to:

England
Three Bridges, West Sussex, a neighbourhood within the town of Crawley
Three Bridges F.C., an association football team
Three Bridges railway station
Three Bridges depot, a rail depot
Three Bridges, Lincolnshire
Three Bridges, London, Isambard Kingdom Brunel’s last major undertaking in 1859
St Bernard's Hospital, Hanwell, London

United States
Three Bridges, New Jersey, an unincorporated village of Readington, United States
Three Bridges School, part of Readington Township Public Schools, New Jersey
Three Bridges (gospel group), a southern gospel vocal trio

Elsewhere
Three Bridges, Victoria, Australia
Triple Bridge, a landmark in Ljubljana, Slovenia